Satid Sri-Uthai (born November 4, 1997) is a Thai professional footballer who plays as a left back for Thai club Chainat United.

External links
 

1997 births
Living people
Satid Sri-Uthai
Association football fullbacks
Satid Sri-Uthai
Satid Sri-Uthai
Satid Sri-Uthai
Satid Sri-Uthai
Satid Sri-Uthai
Satid Sri-Uthai